The 2003 Russian Figure Skating Championships took place in Kazan from December 26 to 29, 2002. Skaters competed in the disciplines of men's singles, ladies' singles, pair skating, and ice dancing. The results were one of the criteria used to pick the Russian teams to the 2003 World Championships and the 2003 European Championships.

Senior results

Men

Ladies

Pairs

Ice dancing

External links
 results

2002 in figure skating
Russian Figure Skating Championships, 2003
Figure skating
Russian Figure Skating Championships
December 2002 sports events in Russia